Stephanie Sanders Sullivan (born September 27, 1958) is an American diplomat and the previous ambassador to Ghana. She served as Deputy Assistant Secretary for Central African Affairs and Security Affairs for the Bureau of African Affairs from January 2017 to November 2018. She previously served as United States Ambassador to the Republic of the Congo, having been nominated by President Obama on June 13, 2013, confirmed by the Senate on August 1, 2013, and served through January 20, 2017.

As of November 2022, Sullivan is the nominee to be the US Representative to the African Union.

Early life and education
Sullivan was born Stephanie Sanders, daughter of Dr. John E. Sanders, a geologist who taught at Yale University and Barnard College and his wife, Barbara Wood Sanders, an art teacher. Sullivan attended the Hackley School. As an undergraduate, Sullivan attended Brown University, where she majored in English language and literature and received the Francis Driscoll Premium Award from the Classics Department. She also excelled as a collegiate athlete. She played soccer and lacrosse all four years, and made All-Ivy teams in ice hockey, lacrosse and soccer. She graduated with a B.A. in 1980.

Sullivan later received an M.S. in security strategy from the National Defense University at the National War College.

Career
Sullivan began her career with service in The Peace Corps, working in the Democratic Republic of Congo (then Zaire) from 1980 to 1983, teaching English in Mbanza Mboma. It was in the Peace Corps that she met her husband, John Sullivan, who was serving as a volunteer in Zaire.

When she embarked on a career as a U.S. diplomat, Sullivan returned to Africa, serving as a consular and political officer in Cameroon from 1986 to 1988. In 1988 she began the first of several tours with the Executive Secretariat Operations Center. Other assignments included serving as Chief of Operations for the Africa Region of Peace Corps from 1994 to 96, as well as a role as Political Chief at the U.S. Embassy in Ghana. Just before accepting the role as Ambassador, she served two years as Chief of Staff to the Deputy Secretary of State for Management and Resources.

Ambassador to Ghana
Sullivan was nominated to be the next ambassador to Ghana by President Donald Trump on July 9, 2018 and confirmed by the U.S. Senate on September 6, 2018. She presented her credentials to President Nana Addo Dankwa Akufo-Addo on January 23, 2019.

Representative to the African Union
On June 15, 2022, President Joe Biden nominated Sullivan to be the next US Representative to the African Union. Hearings on her nomination were held before the Senate Foreign Relations Committee on November 29, 2022. Her nomination is pending before the committee.

Personal life
Sullivan and her husband, John, have two sons. In addition to English, she speaks French, Spanish and Lingala.

References

1958 births
Ambassadors of the United States to the Republic of the Congo
Brown University alumni
Living people
Obama administration personnel
Ambassadors of the United States to Ghana
21st-century American diplomats
American women ambassadors
National Defense University alumni
21st-century American women
American women diplomats